The Sulphur River is a  river in northeast Texas and southwest Arkansas in the United States.

Geography

The Sulphur River begins at the confluence of its north and south forks forming (following earlier meanders) the northern and southern boundaries of, and meeting at the eastern end of, Delta County (Texas).

The river flows generally eastward through several Texas counties and provides most of the water for Wright Patman Lake, on the border between Bowie and Cass counties. Below Wright Patman Dam, the river continues its generally eastward flow to the Arkansas state line. The river flows southeastward through Miller County in southwestern Arkansas for  until it joins the southbound Red River east of Doddridge, a few miles north of the Louisiana border.

Recreation
The Sulphur River provides numerous opportunities for fishing, boating, and other activities.

Above Wright Patman Lake, the river has enough water for recreation most of the time. The flow is slow, and the river is murky, largely due to channelization upstream. Below Wright Patman Dam, the river flow depends on the amount of water being released from the dam; however, water quality is usually good.

Wright Patman Lake provides additional opportunities for camping, boating, swimming, and fishing.

See also
 List of rivers of Texas
 Sulphur Springs, Texas

References

External links
 Sulphur River Basin Authority
 Texas Parks and Wildlife Department: An Analysis of Texas Waterways
 

Rivers of Arkansas
Rivers of Texas
Tributaries of the Red River of the South
Bodies of water of Miller County, Arkansas